The 2017–18 St. Bonaventure Bonnies women's basketball team represents the St. Bonaventure University during the 2017–18 NCAA Division I women's basketball season. The Bonnies, led by second year head coach Jesse Fleming, play their home games at Reilly Center and were members of the Atlantic 10 Conference. They finished the season 8–22, 3–13 in A-10 play to finish in a tie for eleventh place. They lost in the first round of the A-10 women's tournament to George Mason.

Media
All non-televised Bonnies home games air on the A-10 Digital Network. WGWE continue to be the radio broadcaster for the team. Chris Russell is the team's play-by-play voice; no color commentator is used.

Roster

Schedule

|-
!colspan=9 style="background:#; color:#FFFFFF;"| Exhibition

|-
!colspan=9 style="background:#; color:#FFFFFF;"| Non-conference regular season

|-
!colspan=9 style="background:#; color:#FFFFFF;"| Atlantic 10 regular season

|-
!colspan=9 style="background:#; color:#FFFFFF;"| Atlantic 10 Tournament

Rankings
2017–18 NCAA Division I women's basketball rankings

See also
 2017–18 St. Bonaventure Bonnies men's basketball team

References

Saint Bonaventure
St. Bonaventure Bonnies women's basketball seasons